Michael D. Knox (born 1946 in Wyandotte, Michigan, grew up on Grosse Ile, Michigan), is an American antiwar activist, educator, psychologist, and author, living in Dunedin, Florida.  He is Emeritus Distinguished University Professor in the Department of Mental Health Law and Policy; Affiliate Distinguished Professor, Department of Internal Medicine; and Affiliate Distinguished Professor Emeritus of Global Health at the University of South Florida (USF) in Tampa, Florida. Knox Chairs founded the US Peace Memorial Foundation, a 501(c)(3) public charity that awards the US Peace Prize and he is the author of the book ENDING U.S. WARS by Honoring Americans Who Work for Peace.

Education, awards, and honors
Ph.D., University of Michigan, Department of Psychology, 1974
M.A., University of Michigan, Department of Psychology, 1973
M.S.W., University of Michigan, School of Social Work, 1971
B.A., Eastern Michigan University, Biology Major, Chemistry and Psychology Minors, 1968

Knox is a Fellow of the American Psychological Association and the Association for Psychological Science. Fellow status in both organizations is granted in recognition of outstanding and distinguished contributions to the science and profession of psychology. In 2005 he was inducted into Sigma Xi, the international honor society of research scientists and engineers.

Career
Knox's career has spanned the fields and topics of death and dying, community mental health, ethics, the prevention of HIV/AIDS, and peace. Much of his academic work has been accomplished at the University of South Florida, where he has been a faculty member since 1986. At USF, Knox has been responsible for more than $50 million in grants and other external funding to the university. He developed grant-funded collaborations with the USF Departments of Internal Medicine, Psychiatry, Pediatrics, and Criminology and with the USF College of Public Health. He also developed grant-funded consortia with the University of California at San Francisco, University of Florida, University of Miami, University of Puerto Rico, University of the Virgin Islands, Florida A&M University, and Emory University.

As a tenured professor, he served on dissertation committees and taught courses including "Honors Seminar in Applied Ethics", "Death and Dying", and "HIV and Mental Health".  He has published and presented widely, primarily on the topics of HIV/AIDS, peace, community mental health, and planning for death. In 1995, he co-authored LAST WISHES: A Handbook to Guide Your Survivors. The book has been favorably reviewed by The Journal of the American Medical Association, the British medical journal The Lancet, and The Saturday Evening Post. He is the senior editor and contributor to HIV and Community Mental Healthcare, a book published in 1998 by The Johns Hopkins University Press.

Mental health work and scholarship
Before his tenure at the University of South Florida, Knox was director of the Western Tidewater Mental Health Center in Virginia (1978–1986). He also served on the faculty of the Eastern Virginia Medical School and on the board of directors of the Eastern Virginia Health Systems Agency. He has held a variety of leadership positions in national and state professional organizations and has been honored many times for his work.

Michael Knox joined the USF faculty in 1986.  For nine years, until 1995, Knox headed the only academic department of community mental health in the United States. As department chair, he directed an 80-member staff and oversaw an annual budget of $2.3 million.  In 1995, and again in 1996, he was elected president of the USF Faculty Senate. He was elected chair of the Advisory Council of Faculty Senates for 1997/1998. This organization represented all ten state universities and provided consultation to the chancellor and Florida Board of Regents regarding academic issues.  Since 1997 he has held the title of distinguished university professor at USF. In 1999 he served as a visiting scholar at the University of Oxford in England as part of a sabbatical assignment related to end-of-life care.  His work is characterized by long-standing leadership positions in the field of community mental health, including service on the board of directors of the National Council of Community Mental Health Centers and advisory positions to the Joint Commission on Accreditation of Hospitals. In addition, he chaired the first steering committee for the National Registry of Community Mental Health Services and has conducted site reviews nationwide for the federal Center for Mental Health Services.

HIV/AIDS work and scholarship
As founder and director of the USF Center for HIV Education and Research, Knox oversaw an annual budget of well over $3 million. Since 1988, the USF Center has provided continuing education to more than 500,000 health and mental healthcare professionals and students.

As the Principal Investigator, Knox directed the Florida/Caribbean AETC, which was one of several centers based at leading universities around the country. The F/C AETC's mission was to ensure that physicians, nurses, nurse practitioners, physician assistants, dentists, pharmacists, and other health professionals in Florida, Puerto Rico, and the U.S. Virgin Islands receive state-of-the-art information, training, and consultation on the prevention and treatments of HIV and AIDS. Knox supervised the work of over 80 expert faculty in the field of HIV/AIDS as the Center worked collaboratively with the University of South Florida, the University of Puerto Rico, the University of Florida, the University of Miami, the University of the Virgin Islands and Florida A&M University to provide faculty and clinical training sites throughout the region.

Knox traveled to India in 2003 to speak and to dedicate two new educational programs associated with USF. He was co-chair of the American Foundation for AIDS Research's (amfAR) 16th National HIV/AIDS Update Conference held in March 2004 and delivered an opening plenary which argued against current US wars in favor of more government support for prevention.

Antiwar efforts
The long-standing antiwar activities of Michael Knox began in 1965 in opposition to the war in Vietnam.  As a delegate to the 20th National Student Congress, he introduced a successful resolution to hold an anti-war demonstration in August 1967 in front of the White House.  In 1970, Knox co-founded a draft counseling center and, in 1971, he blew the whistle on prohibited classified research at the University of Michigan and provided evidence that university researchers were perfecting weapon systems used by the military to kill and incapacitate other human beings.
Since then, he has continued to engage in speeches, debates, interviews and other actions regarding peace.

In 2005, Knox founded the US Peace Memorial Foundation. He directs its nationwide effort to recognize antiwar/peace leadership by writing and editing the US Peace Registry, awarding the annual US Peace Prize, providing educational programs, and eventually building a national monument - the US Peace Memorial - in Washington, DC.
He was awarded the 2007 Marsella Psychologists for Social Responsibility Award. He has officiated at the awarding of the US Peace Prize every year since 2009. In 2018, he was included in Transcend Media's “In Pursuit of Peace and Justice: 100 Peace & Justice Leaders and Models.”

References

External links 
 Department of Mental Health Law and Policy
 USF College of Public Health
 U.S. Peace Memorial Foundation
 University of South Florida Department of Internal Medicine

21st-century American psychologists
American psychology writers
American anti-war activists
Living people
1946 births
University of Michigan School of Social Work alumni
American educators
20th-century American psychologists